Curfman is a surname. Notable people with the surname include:

Raymond A. Curfman (1915–1993), American football player and coach
Shannon Curfman (born 1985), American blues-rock guitarist and singer
Steven Curfman (born 1986), American soccer player

English-language surnames